In quantum physics and quantum chemistry, an avoided crossing (sometimes called intended crossing, non-crossing or anticrossing) is the phenomenon where two eigenvalues of a Hermitian matrix representing a quantum observable and depending on N continuous real parameters cannot become equal in value ("cross") except on a manifold of N-2 dimensions.  The phenomenon is also known as the von Neumann–Wigner theorem. In the case of a diatomic molecule (with one parameter, namely the bond length), this means that the eigenvalues cannot cross at all. In the case of a triatomic molecule, this means that the eigenvalues can coincide only at a single point (see conical intersection).

This is particularly important in quantum chemistry. In the Born–Oppenheimer approximation, the electronic molecular Hamiltonian is diagonalized on a set of distinct molecular geometries (the obtained eigenvalues are the values of the adiabatic potential energy surfaces). The geometries for which the potential energy surfaces are avoiding to cross are the locus where the Born–Oppenheimer approximation fails.

Avoided crossing also occur in the resonance frequencies of undamped mechanical systems, where the stiffness and mass matrices are real symmetric. There the resonance frequencies are the square root of the generalized eigenvalues.

In two-state systems

Emergence 
Study of a two-level system is of vital importance in quantum mechanics because it embodies simplification of many of physically realizable systems. The effect of perturbation on a two-state system Hamiltonian is manifested through avoided crossings in the plot of individual energy vs energy difference curve of the eigenstates. The two-state Hamiltonian can be written as

These two eigenvectors designate the two states of the system. If the system is prepared in either of the states it would remain in that state. If  happens to be equal to  there will be a twofold degeneracy in the Hamiltonian. In that case any superposition of the degenerate eigenstates is evidently another eigenstate of the Hamiltonian. Hence the system prepared in any state will remain in that forever.

However, when subjected to an external perturbation, the matrix elements of the Hamiltonian change. For the sake of simplicity we consider a perturbation with only off diagonal elements. Since the overall Hamiltonian must be Hermitian we may simply write the new Hamiltonian

Where P is the perturbation with zero diagonal terms. The fact that P is Hermitian fixes its off-diagonal components. The modified eigenstates can be found by diagonalising the modified Hamiltonian. It turns out that the new eigenvalues are,

The curve asymptotically approaches the original unperturbed energy levels. Analyzing the curves it becomes evident that even if the original states were degenerate (i.e.  ) the new energy states are no longer equal. Thus with the effect of the perturbation these level crossings are avoided.

Quantum resonance 

The immediate impact of avoided level crossing in a degenerate two state system is the emergence of a lowered energy eigenstate. The effective lowering of energy always correspond to increasing stability.(see: Energy minimization) Bond resonance in organic molecules exemplifies the occurrence of such avoided crossings. To describe these cases we may note that the non-diagonal elements in an erstwhile diagonalised Hamiltonian not only modify the energy eigenvalues but also superpose the old eigenstates into the new ones. These effects are more prominent if the original Hamiltonian had degeneracy. This superposition of eigenstates to attain more stability is precisely the phenomena of chemical bond resonance.

 with 

From simple calculations it can be shown that

 and
 where 

It is evident that both of the new eigenstates are superposition of the original degenerate eigenstates and one of the eigenvalues (here ) is less than the original unperturbed eigenenergy. So the corresponding stable system will naturally mix up the former unperturbed eigenstates to minimize its energy. The symmetry of these two structures mandates that .

However it turns out that the two-state Hamiltonian  of benzene is not diagonal. The off-diagonal elements result into lowering of energy and the benzene molecule stabilizes in a structure which is a superposition of these symmetric ones with energy .
For any general two-state system avoided level crossing repels the eigenstates  and  such that it requires more energy for the system to achieve the higher energy configuration.

Resonances in avoided crossing 

In molecules, the nonadiabatic couplings between two adiabatic potentials build the avoided crossing (AC) region. The rovibronic resonances in the AC region of two-coupled potentials are very special, since they are not in the bound state region of the adiabatic potentials, and they usually do not play important roles on the scatterings and are less discussed. Yu Kun Yang et al studied this problem in the New J. Phys. 22 (2020). Exemplified in particle scattering, resonances in the AC region are comprehensively investigated. The effects of resonances in the AC region on the scattering cross sections strongly depend on the nonadiabatic couplings of the system, it can be very significant as sharp peaks, or inconspicuous buried in the background. More importantly, it shows a simple quantity proposed by Zhu and Nakamura to classify the coupling strength of nonadiabatic interactions, can be well applied to quantitatively estimate the importance of resonances in the AC region.

General avoided crossing theorem
The above illustration of avoided crossing however is a very specific case. From a generalised view point the phenomenon of avoided crossing is actually controlled by the parameters behind the perturbation. For the most general perturbation  affecting a two-dimensional subspace of the Hamiltonian , we may write the effective Hamiltonian matrix in that subspace as

Here the elements of the state vectors were chosen to be real so that all the matrix elements become real.
Now the eigenvalues of the system for this subspace are given by

The terms under the square root are squared real numbers. So for these two levels to cross we simultaneously require

 
Now if the perturbation  has  parameters  we may in general vary these numbers to satisfy these two equations.

 
In general it is not possible to find one  such that both of the equations are satisfied. However, if we allow another parameter to be free, both of these two equations will now be controlled by the same two parameters 

And generally there will be two such values of them for which the equations will be simultaneously satisfied. So with  distinct parameters  parameters can always be chosen arbitrarily and still we can find two such s such that there would be crossing of energy eigenvalues. Geometrically the eigenvalue equations describe a surface in  dimensional space. 

Since their intersection is parametrized by  coordinates, we may formally state that for  continuous real parameters controlling the perturbed Hamiltonian, the levels (or surfaces) can only cross at a manifold of dimension . However the symmetry of the Hamiltonian has a role to play in the dimensionality. If the original Hamiltonian has asymmetric states, the off-diagonal terms vanish automatically to ensure hermiticity. This allows us to get rid of the equation . Now from similar arguments as posed above, it is straightforward that for an asymmetrical Hamiltonian, the intersection of energy surfaces takes place in a manifold of dimension .

In polyatomic molecules
In an N-atomic polyatomic molecule there are 3N-6 vibrational 
coordinates (3N-5 for a linear molecule) that enter into 
the electronic Hamiltonian as parameters. For a diatomic
molecule there is only one such coordinate, the bond length
r. Thus, due to the avoided crossing theorem, in a diatomic
molecule we cannot have level crossings between electronic 
states of the same symmetry. However, for a polyatomic 
molecule there is more than one geometry parameter in the 
electronic Hamiltonian and level crossings between electronic
states of the same symmetry are not avoided.

See also
 Geometric phase
 Christopher Longuet-Higgins
 Conical intersection
 Vibronic coupling
 Adiabatic theorem
 Bond hardening
 Bond softening
 Landau–Zener formula
 Level repulsion

References

Quantum mechanics
Quantum chemistry